The Scottish Junior Football Association East Region Premiership, also known for sponsorship reasons as the McBookie.com East Premiership, was the highest division of the East Region of the Scottish Junior Football Association. From its inception in 2002 until 2020, it was known as the SJFA East Region Super League.

From the 2007–08 season, the winners of the league were eligible to enter the senior Scottish Cup at its earliest stage, with Linlithgow Rose being the first champions to take part in the Scottish Cup.

In 2013–14 the East Super League expanded from its original twelve clubs to sixteen as part of a wider league restructuring in the East Region. For the 2018–19 season, league reconstruction reduced the Super League back to twelve teams after 24 Junior clubs from the east region moved to the East of Scotland Football League. Further changes were made to create two regional divisions in the 2019–20 season (declared void prior to completion).

From the 2006–07 season until the 2017–18 season, the Super League relegated into the Premier League, which in turn fed down into the North and South divisions. The mass resignations from 2018 also led to reorganisations in the structure below the top tier.

From the 2021–22 season, the SJFA East Region along with North Caledonian Football Association and the SJFA North Region were incorporated into the Scottish football league system to form a fully-integrated Tier 6 below the Highland League. With all south (Lothian) clubs having already left the SJFA league to join the East of Scotland League (while retaining their membership), it was decided the new single division formed by the remaining north (Tayside) clubs would be named the Midlands Football League, although it would still be administered by the SJFA.

Champions and season summaries

References

External links
East Region Superleague at Non-League Scotland (archive version, 2007-08 membership)

 
1
Sports leagues established in 2002
2002 establishments in Scotland
Sports leagues disestablished in 2021
2021 disestablishments in Scotland